Anthony Giardina  is an American novelist, short story writer, essayist and playwright. Giardina started his professional career as an actor.  He switched to play writing, and eventually began writing novels.

His work is particularly influenced by American culture in the 1950s.  He was born in 1950 and grew up on a street in Waltham, Massachusetts, a largely Italian and Irish working class "sleeper" suburb of Boston on the trolley line to Cambridge.  The protagonist's childhood neighborhood and schools in Recent History were largely modeled on Waltham.

Career
Giardina's plays have been produced in New Haven, New York City, and Washington, D.C.  He is a regular contributor to publications such as The New York Times Magazine, GQ, Esquire, and Harper's.  His books include Men With Debts, A Boy's Pretensions, Recent History, The Country of Marriage, and White Guys.

His play Living At Home opened Off-Broadway at Playwrights Horizons in December 1978. His play The City of Conversation opened Off-Broadway at the Lincoln Center Mitzi Newhouse Theater in May 2014, and was nominated for the 2015 Outer Critics Circle Award for Outstanding New Off-Broadway Play. HIs play 
Black Forest premiered at the Long Wharf Theatre, Connecticut in March–April 2000. Two plays, Black Forest and Custody Of The Eyes, are published by Broadway Play Publishing Inc.

His most recent novel, Norumbega Park, was released by Farrar, Straus and Giroux on January 31, 2012.

Teaching
He has held teaching positions at Mount Holyoke College, the University of Rochester the University of Massachusetts Amherst, and The University of Texas at Austin. Giardina currently teaches at Smith College.

Quote
Anthony Giardina on writing: "When I write fiction, I become the character I'm writing about, just as an actor becomes a character he's playing. You use parts of yourself, people you have known, things that have happened to you, but you're always aware that these things are being used to create a persona that's distinctly not you. Otherwise it wouldn't be any fun."

See also

Chris Bachelder
Peter Gizzi
James Tate
Noy Holland
Sabina Murray
Dara Wier
Sam Michel

References

External links
Anthony Giardina's Official Website
Anthony Giardina's Random House Page
Anthony Giardina's Review of Haunting Midnight (published in the San Francisco Chronicle)
Review of Recent History in the Austin Chronicle of Books by Amanda Eyre Ward
 Review of Giardina play in The New York Times by Frank Rich
 Review of White Guys in the San Francisco Chronicle by Mario Bruzzone
Anthony Giardina Papers

20th-century American novelists
21st-century American novelists
American male novelists
Year of birth missing (living people)
Living people
Mount Holyoke College faculty
University of Massachusetts Amherst faculty
American male short story writers
20th-century American dramatists and playwrights
American male essayists
American male dramatists and playwrights
20th-century American short story writers
21st-century American short story writers
20th-century American essayists
21st-century American essayists
20th-century American male writers
21st-century American male writers
Novelists from Massachusetts